Patrick Lee "Pat" MacDonald (born August 6, 1952) is an American musician and songwriter. He is the singer, guitarist, and main songwriter for Timbuk 3, nominated for a Grammy Award for Best New Artist in 1987. He formed the duo with his wife, Barbara K. MacDonald, in Madison, Wisconsin in 1984 before moving to Austin, Texas, that same year. Their breakup in 1995 spurred a solo career that has steadily produced releases in both Europe and the US. "MacDonald is long known for his playful, edgy songs," says Guitar Player magazine (May 2007, p. 38).

Recording career
Songwriting credits include collaborations with Cher, Keith Urban, Imogen Heap, Stewart Copeland of The Police, Peter Frampton, and Japanese composer Ryuichi Sakamoto.  Songs he has written, or co-written, have been recorded by Aerosmith, Oysterhead, Cher, Jools Holland, Billy Ray Cyrus, Night Ranger, Zucchero and others, and have appeared in movies from the controversial horror classic The Texas Chainsaw Massacre 2 (1986) with Dennis Hopper, to Tommy Boy (1995) starring Chris Farley.

MacDonald and his friend and collaborator, Eric McFadden, record and perform as the gothic-country duo, The Legendary Sons of Crack Daniels. He performed and toured as Purgatory Hill with Milwaukee singer and songwriter Melaniejane.

In 2005, he co-founded Steel Bridge Songfest, an annual not-for-profit benefit concert and songwriting festival held in his current hometown of Sturgeon Bay, Wisconsin.

Solo album discography
 Pat MacDonald Sleeps With His Guitar (Ark 21), (1997)
 Begging Her Graces (Ulftone), (1999)
 Degrees of Gone (Ulftone), (2001)
 Strange Love: PM Does DM (Ulftone), (2003)
 In the Red Room (DarkPresents), (2004)
 Troubadour of Stomp (Broken Halo), (2007)
 In the Red Room re-release (SB United) (2008)
 Purgatory Hill self-release (2009)
 The Ragged, Jagged Way Back Home self-release (2019)
 Strange Love: pm does dm (Chronological Records) (2021)

References
 Ferber, Lawrence 2000, 'Unbelievable: Catching up with Cher as she releases one album online and prepares for the follow-up to "Believe"', Frontiers Magazine
 Huyck, Ed 2007, 'Answering a friend's call', Door County Magazine Online
 Isthmus 2007, 'Sons of Crack Daniels, Jane Wiedlin with Whore du Jour, Chris Aaron, Screamin' Cyn Cyn & the Pons, Skintones'
 Moore, Andy 2007, 'Stomping The Chords of Fame', No Depression, no. 67, 20–21.
 Prasad, Anil 2004, 'Fresh Horizons', Innerviews.org
 Prasad, Anil 2007, 'Pat MacDonald', Guitar Player Magazine
 O'Reilly, Ned 2005, 'Pat MacDonald live review', Lumino Magazine
 The Night Eagle Cafe, 'Pat Macdonald', Binghamton, NY.

External links
 
 patsite 
 MySpace
 (Sons of) Crack Daniels MySpace page
 Steel Bridge Songfest official page

1952 births
Living people
American male singers
American rock singers
American rock guitarists
American male guitarists
Musicians from Green Bay, Wisconsin
Musicians from Madison, Wisconsin
American new wave musicians
People from Sturgeon Bay, Wisconsin
20th-century American guitarists
20th-century American male musicians
Timbuk3 members